Operation Phantom Linebacker was a coalition military operation in Iraq designed to interdict anti-government fighters from entering Iraq from Syria. The U.S. 3rd Brigade and the 2nd Infantry Division (United States) conducted the operation with the Iraqi National Guard, Iraqi Border Police, and other Multinational Forces. The U.S. III Corps uses 'Phantom' as its nickname. Launched in early August 2004.

Military Units Involved
US forces reported to be involved were
 3rd Brigade, United States Army
 2nd Infantry Division (United States)

Iraqi Units involved
 Iraqi National Guard
 Iraqi Border Police

Casualties
No US, Coalition or Iraqi casualties or deaths were reported during the operation.

References

 National Force – Iraq

Military operations of the Iraq War involving the United States
Military operations of the Iraq War involving Iraq
Military operations of the Iraq War in 2004
Iraqi insurgency (2003–2011)